Coral Buttsworth defeated Kathleen Le Messurier 9–7, 6–4, in the final to win the women's singles tennis title at the 1932 Australian Championships.

Seeds
 n/a
  Marjorie Crawford (quarterfinals)
  Coral Buttsworth (champion)
  Frances Hoddle-Wrigley (quarterfinals)

Draw

Key
 Q = Qualifier
 WC = Wild card
 LL = Lucky loser
 r = Retired

Finals

Earlier rounds

Section 1

Section 2

See also
 1932 Australian Championships – Men's singles

Notes

References

External links
 

1932 in women's tennis
1932
1932 in Australian tennis
1932 in Australian women's sport
Women's Singles